Amazing Princess Sarah is a platform-adventure video game developed and released by Haruneko for the Xbox 360's Xbox Live Indie Games, Microsoft Windows (Steam and Desura), and Windows Phone 7/8 in 2014. On June 17 of 2015, it was announced that the game was selected to become a  part of Microsoft's ID@Xbox program.

Gameplay
The gameplay involves 2d platforming with limited combat while navigating though several castle stages. Throwing certain enemies will have different affects. Additionally, each stage has a boss fight with some being out run sections with other evolving actual combat. The game unlocks new modes each time the game is completed, changing the design of the princess, title screen, and adding new challenges to the playthrough.

Plot
Demon queen Lilith has seduced and kidnapped the king of Kaleiya. Princess Sarah embarks on a quest to destroy Lilith's forces and rescue her father.

Reception
It took the game 10 days to be Greenlit on Steam. Alex Carlson of Hardcore Gamer gave the Windows version of this "underdog... competent, if uninspired indie platformer" a review score of 3/5, opining, "Amazing Princess Sarah is well-worth five bucks if you love old-school gems like Castlevania but if you’re not into that classic retro scene, [it] will do as much to convince you of the genre’s flaws as it convinces you of its strengths." Crystal Steltenpohl of Diehard GameFAN wrote about the Xbox 360 version, "The (mostly) fun level design, interesting gameplay, and strong visuals bring together an experience that will remind you of older Metroidvania games while keeping it fresh. (...) The game is only $1. It's practically a steal. If you like these types of games, this is one I wouldn't recommend passing up on." According to Rob Hamilton of HonestGamers, who gave it a 8/10, "The game's not perfect, but thanks to its low asking price, it's a great way to enjoy a flashback to the games you may have enjoyed during your childhood."

References

External links
Official website
Amazing Princess Sarah at Hardcore Gaming 101

2014 video games
Fantasy video games
Indie video games
Metroidvania games
Microsoft XNA games
Nintendo Switch games
PlayStation 4 games
Princess characters in video games
Retro-style video games
Side-scrolling platform games
Side-scrolling role-playing video games
Single-player video games
Steam Greenlight games
Video games developed in Italy
Video games featuring female protagonists
Windows games
Windows Phone games
Xbox 360 games
Xbox One games